Shigayevo is a rural locality (a selo) in Kabansky District, Republic of Buryatia, Russia. The population was 513 as of 2010. There are 5 streets.

Geography 
Shigayevo is located 21 km northwest of Kabansk (the district's administrative centre) by road. Murzino is the nearest rural locality.

References 

Rural localities in Kabansky District